Yanqi may refer to the following in China:

Xinjiang
Karasahr (焉耆), ancient kingdom
Yanqi Hui Autonomous County (焉耆回族自治县), in Bayin'gholin Mongol Autonomous Prefecture

Elsewhere
Yanqi, Beijing (雁栖), in Huairou District, Beijing